Rudo Neshamba (born 10 February 1992) is a Zimbabwean footballer who plays for Israeli Ligat Nashim club FC Ramat HaSharon and the Zimbabwe women's national football team.

Club career
Neshamba began playing football in primary school and joined Inline Academy in 2006. In 2013, she spent six months on loan with Double Action Ladies FC in Botswana, where she scored 14 goals in less than half a season.

International career
At the 2008 edition of the Council of Southern Africa Football Associations (COSAFA) Cup, Neshamba made her debut for the Zimbabwe national team. She scored three goals in the 2015 CAF Women's Olympic Qualifying Tournament, including two in the decisive win over Cameroon which clinched Zimbabwe's shock qualification for the final tournament in Brazil.

In March 2016, it was reported that a "chronic" knee injury was jeopardising Neshamba's place at the Olympic games, and that the Zimbabwe Football Association (ZIFA) were failing to pay for her medical care. A London-based expatriate benefactor provided Z$90 for the knee scans she needed.

References

External links

 

1992 births
Living people
Sportspeople from Bulawayo
Zimbabwean women's footballers
Women's association football forwards
F.C. Ramat HaSharon players
Zimbabwe women's international footballers
Olympic footballers of Zimbabwe
Footballers at the 2016 Summer Olympics
Zimbabwean expatriate footballers
Zimbabwean expatriate sportspeople in Botswana
Expatriate footballers in Botswana
Zimbabwean expatriate sportspeople in Israel
Expatriate footballers in Israel